The following is a list of web browsers for various Unix and Unix-like operating systems. Not all of these browsers are specific to these operating systems; some are available on non-Unix systems as well. Some, but not most, have a mobile version.

Graphical
Colored items in this table are discontinued.

Text-based
 Links
 ELinks
 Line-mode browser
 Lynx
 w3m

See also
 List of web browsers
 Comparison of web browsers
 Comparison of lightweight web browsers

References
https://www.mozilla.org/en-US/firefox/android/

Web browsers